Bolshiye Vsegodichi is a rural locality (a selo) in Malyginskoye Rural Settlement, Kovrovsky District, Vladimir Oblast, Russia. The population was 182 as of 2010. There are 7 streets.

Geography 
Bolshiye Vsegodichi is located 16 km north of Kovrov (the district's administrative centre) by road. Malye Vsegodichi is the nearest rural locality.

References 

Rural localities in Kovrovsky District